The Unibón River is a river of Morovis, Vega Baja, and Corozal in Puerto Rico. There is a bridge that goes over the Unibón River.

See also
 List of rivers of Puerto Rico
 Unibón

References

External links
 USGS Hydrologic Unit Map – Caribbean Region (1974)
 Ríos de Puerto Rico 

Rivers of Puerto Rico